The Salinian Block or Salinian terrane is a geologic terrane which lies west of the main trace of the San Andreas Fault system in California.  It is bounded on the south by the Big Pine Fault in Ventura County and on the west by the Nacimiento Fault.  It was named for the Salinas Valley in Monterey County, California.

Geology

The Salinian Block is largely granitic, in accordance with its continental crustal origin.  This composition contrasts sharply, and paradoxically, with much of the crust to its east, which is sedimentary and oceanic in origin. The block's granitic core, fragments of the batholith of the Peninsular Ranges, shares its origins with the  Sierra Nevada mountains far to the east.

During the past 30 million years the North American Plate has been overriding the East Pacific Rise and transform faulting along the developing San Andreas fault zone. Successive "stretched out" slivers of the Sierra Nevada - the Peninsular Batholith - have been and currently still are moving to the northwest to their current location. The granitic plutons of the Salinas block stretch from Bodega Head in the north to Mount Pinos at the southern end of the block.

In the years since the 1974 study by Johnson and Normark the connection with the southern Sierra Nevada has been questioned, stating that "it more nearly resembles granite in the Mojave Desert".

Notable Features
Some of the more notable portions of the block are visible as:
 
 
 
 
 
 
 
 
 
 
 

Much of the mountainous terrain along the Salinian Block is protected under the US Forest Service and U.S. Fish and Wildlife Service, most notably within Los Padres National Forest, Julia Pfeiffer Burns State Park, and Point Reyes National Seashore.

References

External links
 Marin College: "Feldspar Staining of the Plutonic Rocks of the Salinian Terrane"

Terranes
Geologic formations of California
Geology of Marin County, California
Geology of Monterey County, California
Geology of San Luis Obispo County, California
Geology of Santa Cruz County, California
Salinian Block